August Rieger (1914–1984) was an Austrian screenwriter and film director. He worked in the Austrian and later the West German film industry.

Selected filmography
 The Blue Danube (1955)
 The Doctor's Secret (1955)
 Forest Liesel (1956)
 Her Corporal (1956)
 Imperial and Royal Field Marshal (1956)
 Candidates for Marriage (1958)
 Hello Taxi (1958)
 Girls for the Mambo-Bar (1959)
 Der Orgelbauer von St. Marien (1961)
 Das Mädel aus dem Böhmerwald (1965)
 Always Trouble with the Teachers (1968)
 Peter und Sabine (1968)
 Help, I Love Twins (1969)
 The Seven Red Berets (1969)
 The Young Tigers of Hong Kong (1969)
 When the Mad Aunts Arrive (1970)
 The Vampire Happening (1971)
 Charley's Nieces (1974)
 Revenge of the East Frisians (1974)
 Monika and the Sixteen Year Olds (1975)

References

Bibliography
 Fritsche, Maria. Homemade Men In Postwar Austrian Cinema: Nationhood, Genre and Masculinity . Berghahn Books, 2013.
 Goble, Alan. The Complete Index to Literary Sources in Film. Walter de Gruyter, 1999.

External links

1914 births
1984 deaths
Austrian film directors
Film people from Vienna
Austrian screenwriters
Austrian producers
Austrian emigrants to Germany

de:August Rieger